Kim Carnes is the second studio album by Kim Carnes, released in 1975 (see 1975 in music).

The album gave Carnes her first hit, with "You're a Part of Me" (solo version) peaking in 1976 at #34 on the Billboard Adult Contemporary charts. Although this album hasn't been released on CD, eight of the album's eleven songs can be found on the European CD "Master Series".

Background 
After releasing her debut album Rest on Me through Amos Records in 1971, Carnes signed to A&M Records in early 1975. She described Kim Carnes as a "much more even" record than her debut, owing to her increased experience with writing and recording demos. "You're a Part of Me" was released as the lead single, having originally been recorded by Susan Jacks in 1974. Carnes' version reached number 32 on the Billboard Adult Contemporary chart in February 1976. Two years later, a re-recording of the song in duet with Gene Cotton reached number 36 on the Billboard Hot 100 chart, and number 6 on the Adult Contemporary chart.

Critical reception

In a positive review, Cash Box commended the "soul" in Carnes' voice, stating that "an aura of feel and sensitivity between singer and song predominates throughout". In a review of the single, Billboard likened "You're a Part of Me" to the music of Olivia Newton-John, describing it as a "pretty ballad".

Track listing

Personnel
Adapted from the album liner notes.

 Kim Carnes – lead vocals, backing vocals, Fender Rhodes 
 Mentor Williams – production, backing vocals
 Jim Keltner – drums
 Leland Sklar – bass
 Dean Parks – guitars
 David Foster – piano, clavinet, Fender Rhodes
 Steve Forman – percussion
 Michael Utley – organ, Moog synthesizer
 Maxine Willard – backing vocals
 Julia Tillman – backing vocals
 Dave Ellingson – backing vocals
 David Briggs – string arrangements 
 Steve Dorff – string arrangementsstring arrangements

Technical
 Rick Porter – engineer
 Chuck Trammel – second engineer
 Bernie Grundman – mastering

Design
 Roland Young – art direction, photography
 Chuck Beeson – album design

References

1975 albums
Kim Carnes albums
A&M Records albums